Unthought known is a phrase coined by Christopher Bollas in the 1980s to represent those experiences in some way known to the individual, but about which the individual is unable to think. 

At its most compelling, the unthought known stands for those early schemata for interpreting the object world that preconsciously determine our subsequent life expectations. In this sense, the unthought known refers to preverbal, unschematised early experience/trauma that may determine one's behaviour unconsciously, barred to conscious thought.

Prehistory
It has been suggested that behind Bollas's concept lay a comment reported by Freud from a patient to the effect that he had always known something but he had never thought of it. 

The term also has been linked to W. R. Bion's idea of Beta-elements – psychic experiences which cannot yet be processed in any way by the mind.

Central elements
Bollas saw several elements as going to make up the substance of the unthought known. Persistent moods can be considered to preserve elementary but preschematized states of mind into later life; the complex early interplay of self and (primary) object may also be preserved in the unthought known; early aesthetic experience – pre-verbal – can again form part of the unthought known.

Bollas also linked the concept to D. W. Winnicott's notion of the true self.

Systems theory
In terms of systems-centered therapy, the concept refers to the boundary between apprehensive knowing (non-verbal) and comprehensive knowing – what we can allow ourselves to formulate in words.

Therapy
In therapy, the unthought known can become the subtext of the therapeutic interchange – the therapist's role then becoming that of picking up and containing (through projective identification) what the patients themselves cannot yet think about.

See also
 Uncanny

References

Further reading
Christopher Bollas, The Shadow of the Object: Psychoanalysis of the Unthought Known (1987)
Christopher Bollas, Cracking Up (2003)
Gabriele Schwab, 'Words and Moods' SubStance vol 26 no 3 # 84 (1997) 107–27

External links 
Ian Hunt, "The Unthought Known"

Psychoanalytic theory